Amaral ( or ) is a Portuguese-language surname of toponymic origin (from the Central-Northern Portuguese region of Beira), relatively common in Portugal and Brazil, amongst other countries. Its meaning probably comes from a plantation of a variety of grapes (azal tinto) known as amara (from the Latin language amarus/amara —bitter—, because of the taste of the fruit), used to produce wine, and the suffix -al denotes plantation. Amaral means a plantation of amaras.

This family name is considered to be of high lineage because it descends from the King Ramiro II of León. The current people with this surname are probably of pre-Roman Lusitanian, Christian Visigothic and Sephardic Jewish descent.

A variation is do Amaral.

People
Afrânio Pompílio Gastos do Amaral (1894-1982), Brazilian herpetologist.
Aguida Amaral (born 1972), Timor Leste runner.
Ana Luísa Amaral (1956–2022), Portuguese poet and professor.
Anthony Amaral (1930-1982), US West Historian, horse trainer.
Carlos do Amaral Freire, Brazilian scholar, linguist, translator.
Clarice Amaral (1935-2020), Brazilian television presenter
Dante Amaral (born 1980), Brazilian volleyball player more commonly known as Dante.
David Amaral (born 1950), US professor of psychiatry.
Francisco Keil do Amaral (1910-1975), Portuguese architect.
Karoline Amaral (born 1984), Brazilian model.
Luís Amaral (born 1968), Portuguese physicist
Maria Adelaide Amaral (born 1942), Portuguese-born Brazilian playwright, screenwriter, novelist.
Maria do Carmo Estanislau do Amaral (born 1959), Brazilian botanist
Miguel Amaral (born 1954), Portuguese businessperson, race car driver.
Rich Amaral (born 1962), US baseball player

Artists
Eva Amaral (born 1972), Spanish singer-songwriter.
José Carlos Amaral Vieira (born 1952), Brazilian composer, pianist, musicologist.
Marina Amaral (born 1994), Brazilian colorist.
Olga de Amaral (born 1932), Colombian textile artist.
Roberto Amaral, flamenco dancer and singer for British/US rock band Carmen.
Tarsila do Amaral (1886-1973), Brazilian painter.

Politicians
Diogo Freitas do Amaral (1941-2019), Portuguese politician.
Francisco Joaquim Ferreira do Amaral (1843-1923), Portuguese naval commander, politician.
Francisco Xavier do Amaral (1937-2012), Timor Leste politician.
Joana Amaral Dias (born 1973), Portuguese politician and clinical psychologist
João Maria Ferreira do Amaral (1803-1849), Portuguese colonial governor of Macau.
Moisés da Costa Amaral (1938-1989), Timor Leste politician.
Sérgio Amaral (born 1944), Brazilian politician, diplomat
Tabata Amaral (born 1993), Brazilian politician, education activist

Footballers
Amarildo Souza do Amaral (born 1964), Brazilian footballer
António Amaral (born 1955), Portuguese footballer
Casemiro do Amaral (born 1892), Brazilian footballer
David Amaral (footballer) (born 1958), Spanish footballer and coach
Edinho (footballer, born 1967), Brazilian footballer, Edon Amaral Neto
João Henrique de Andrade Amaral (born 1981), Brazilian footballer more commonly known as Andrade
João Pedro Reis Amaral (born 1991), Portuguese footballer
Jorge Amaral Rodrigues (born 1970), Portuguese footballer
Leandro Amaral (born 1977), Brazilian footballer
Pedro Amaral (born 1997), Portuguese footballer
Rodrigo Amaral (born 1997), Uruguayan footballer
Thiago Amaral (born 1992), Brazilian footballer
Wagner Pereira Cardozo (born 1966), Brazilian footballer

Fictional characters
 Buddy Amaral, the main character (played by Ben Affleck) in the 2000 movie Bounce

See also
Do Amaral

References

Portuguese-language surnames
Sephardic surnames